The Figge Art Museum is an art museum in Davenport, Iowa.  The Figge, as it is commonly known, has an encyclopedic collection and serves as the major art museum for the eastern Iowa and western Illinois region.  The Figge works closely with several regional universities and colleges (see below) as an art resource and collections hub for a number of higher education programs.

The museum opened on August 6, 2005, and is the renamed successor to the Davenport Museum of Art, which was opened on October 10, 1928, as the Davenport Municipal Art Gallery.  The museum has its roots in the Davenport Art Association, which was founded before February 23, 1878, and was re-located on November 15, 1889, to the Bianca Wheeler art studio.  The Figge Art Museum is one of the oldest art institutions in the country and is considered the first municipal art gallery in the United States. The Figge won an AIA award.

The new building was designed by Stirling Prize-winning Modernist British architect David Chipperfield. It was Chipperfield's first architectural commission in the United States.  The Figge Art Museum gets its name from the V.O. and Elizabeth Kahl Figge Foundation, which donated $13 million towards its $47 million construction. The Figge family, a local banking family of Swiss origin, has a long tradition of philanthropy and cultural enrichment.

The first pieces of its collections were donated by Davenport community leader Charles Ficke (1850–1931), a successful lawyer and former mayor, who collected art from around the world. Robert E. Harsche, then Director of the Art Institute of Chicago, reported that to his knowledge no American public art gallery had "started out with so large a number of important paintings as a nucleus."

Figge art collection

The museum has over 4,000 works of art, ranging from the 16th century to the present, and is best known for its extensive collection of Haitian, Colonial Mexican and Midwestern art, particularly pieces by Thomas Hart Benton, Marvin Cone and Grant Wood, including the only self-portrait Wood ever painted. In 1990, Grant Wood's estate, which included his personal effects and various works of art, became the property of the Figge Art Museum through his sister Nan Wood Graham, the woman portrayed in American Gothic.

The institution also houses a substantial American collection (including works by Albert Bierstadt, James McNeill Whistler, William Merritt Chase, Winslow Homer, Andrew Wyeth, Ansel Adams, Andy Warhol, Robert Rauschenberg, Moncho1929 and Jasper Johns), European art (including work by artists such as Albrecht Dürer, Rembrandt, Claude Lorrain, Francisco Goya, Sir Thomas Lawrence, Sir Joshua Reynolds, Sir Henry Raeburn, Toulouse-Lautrec and Pierre-Auguste Renoir), and works from East Asia (with pieces by Hokusai, Hiroshige and Kunisada).  As owners of Grant Wood's estate, the museum is also home to the Grant Wood Archives, and received substantial support from The Henry Luce Foundation for the conservation of these archives.

The museum exhibits an important collection of pieces by Frank Lloyd Wright, the American architect and designer from the Midwest.

Its inaugural exhibition, "The Great American Thing: 1915-1935" opened September 17, 2005, and featured major works from early American Modernists.

University of Iowa art collection 

The Figge Art Museum currently houses the University of Iowa Museum of Art collection, after the University of Iowa's gallery was flooded in 2008.  The collection, which totals over 12,000 works, includes significant paintings by American artists such as Jackson Pollock,  Stuart Davis, Richard Diebenkorn, Peter Golfinopoulos, Sam Gilliam, Adolph Gottlieb, Joan Mitchell, Robert Motherwell, Ad Reinhardt, and Marsden Hartley, as well as European artists such as Pablo Picasso, Henri Matisse, Max Beckmann, Pierre-Auguste Renoir, Paul Gauguin,  Georges Braque, Marc Chagall, Giorgio de Chirico, Lyonel Feininger, Juan Gris, Alexej von Jawlensky, Fernand Léger, Joan Miró, Giorgio Morandi, and Chaïm Soutine.  The collection also contains significant pieces from sub-Saharan Africa, Pre-Columbian art, a significant collection of European and American prints and drawings, as well as many other areas of the world.

Western Illinois University graduate program in Museum Studies 

The Figge Art Museum is home to Western Illinois University's graduate program in Museum Studies, which offers a Master of Arts degree in the various aspects of museum management, such as curatorial design, museum administration and finance, art education, collections management, and marketing/PR.

Other information 

The museum is 115,000 square feet (10,683 m2) and has been accredited by the American Alliance of Museums since 1973.

References 

Museums in Davenport, Iowa
University museums in Iowa
Art museums and galleries in Iowa
Modernist architecture in Iowa
Culture of the Quad Cities
Art museums established in 1928
1928 establishments in Iowa
David Chipperfield buildings